State Road 393 (SR 393) is a  state highway in Okaloosa County, Florida, that runs from U.S. Route 98 in Mary Esther to Florida State Road 189 in southern Wright.

Major intersections

References

External links

FDOT Map of Okaloosa County (Including SR 393)

393
393